Sir Henry Wynn Parry (1899-1964) was a judge of the Chancery Division of the High Court of England and Wales, from 1948 until 1960.

Judicial career

Sir Henry Wynn Parry served as a judge of the High Court, serving in the Chancery division for just under 12 years from 1948 until 1960.  He stepped down on the grounds of ill health, and died a few years later.

By convention Sir Henry's double surname was hyphenated for judicial office.  So as a judge he was known as Mr Justice Wynn-Parry (or Wynn-Parry J) with a hyphen.

Notable judicial decision

Notable decisions of Wynn-Parry J included:
 In re Earl Leven, Inland Revenue Comrs v Williams Deacon's Bank Ltd [1954] 1 WLR 1228

Wynn-Parry Commission 

Sir Henry was the Chair of a Commission of Inquiry set up on 11 May 1962 to investigate the causes of the political disturbances in Guyana which took place on 16 February 1962, popularly known in Guyanese history as "Black Friday".

Family

Sir Henry was father to the noted rheumatologist, Christopher "Kit" Wynn Parry MBE (1924 - 2015).

Arms

Footnotes

1899 births
1994 deaths
20th-century English judges
Chancery Division judges